Katipunan is Philippine revolutionary organization.

Katipunan may also refer to:

 Katipunan, Zamboanga del Norte, municipality in the Philippine province of Zamboanga del Norte
 Katipunan station, a train station in Manila LRT Line 2
 Katipunan Avenue, street in Quezon City
 Katipunan Street, street in Cebu City
 Katipunan, Quezon City (also known as Loyola Heights), a commercialized municipality in the National Capital Region of the Philippines
 Katipunan (TV series), a 2013 Philippine television series